Rik Matthys (9 September 1925 – 13 October 1999) was a Belgian footballer. He played in two matches for the Belgium national football team in 1951.

References

External links
 

1925 births
1999 deaths
Belgian footballers
Belgium international footballers
Place of birth missing
Association football defenders
Footballers from Antwerp